The Daily Times is a daily newspaper published in Blantyre, Malawi. It is the oldest newspaper in the country, founded by the monthly Central African Planter in 1895. Around 1900, the title Central African Times was adopted, and weekly publication. Later the title was changed again, to Nyasaland Times. With Malawian independence in 1964, it became simply The Times (then published bi-weekly), and finally the Daily Times in 1972. 

The publisher is Blantyre Newspapers Limited (BNL), a subsidiary of Blantyre Printing & Publishing Company Ltd., which publishes four sister newspapers: The Daily Times (Monday-Friday), and the weeklies The Weekend Times (Friday afternoon), Malawi News (Saturday), and Sunday Times (Sunday). In the year 2013, Blantyre Printing & Publishing Company Ltd, took a bold step to establish Malawi’s first independent private television station, Times Television (TTV). The MISA award winning TV station has for years been providing local content, stretching over arts, entertainment, sports and current affairs. Times Television is a  Free-To-Air television station and is beamed on Dstv channel 296, Malawi Digital Broadcasting Network Limited (MDBNL) Platform CH 805, GoTV CH 91, Zuku CH 46, Azam TV CH 381, and  StarSat.  

In 2015, Blantyre Printing & Publishing Company Ltd established Times Radio, a sister company of Times Television. Times Radio broadcasts nationwide with most of the programs being broadcast in chichewa. On 29 July 2020, Times Radio had a mix up with a UK based radio station during their interview with Prime Minister Boris Johnson. Blantyre Printing & Publishing Company Ltd is a 360 degree media house consisting of Times Radio  Blantyre Newspapers Limited (BNL) and Times Television. The media house now called "Times 360".

Notable contributors (past and present)
Raphael Tenthani, journalist, columnist

References

External links
 

Publications established in 1895
Newspapers published in Malawi
Mass media in Blantyre
1895 establishments in the British Central Africa Protectorate
English-language newspapers published in Africa